Atypus affinis, the purseweb spider, is a common mygalomorph spider from Europe.

Distribution
It is found in Europe (Netherlands, Germany) and southern England, but ranging as far north as southern Sweden and as far south as North Africa. Its hidden lifestyle makes it a rarely seen species. It is the only British mygalomorph spider. The purse-web spider was previously known from Denmark, but as it had not been seen for 60 years despite persistent searching, it was considered extinct. In 1994, it was rediscovered in Jutland.

Description
They look much like Atypus piceus, but spiderlings are often very lightly colored, and the three-part posterior spinnerets do not have a light blot. Like other mygalomorph spiders, it has fangs that point straight down rather than crossing.

This spider spins an unusual web. It creates a tube of silk that is hidden partially underground, with the portion above ground being covered in leaves and other debris. The spider waits for an insect to land or crawl onto the tube, then bites through the silk to pull the insect inside. These spiders usually do not leave their webs for any reason other than mating.

These spiders become sexually mature at about 4 years. Autumn is the mating season, when the male spiders seek out a female spider and enter her burrow, where they live together until the male dies soon after mating. The female lays her egg sac inside the tube and the spiderlings hatch out the following summer, remaining with their mother for nearly another year after that.

References

External links
Details on Atypus affinis

Atypidae
Spiders of Europe
Spiders of Africa
Spiders described in 1830
Taxa named by Karl Eichwald